The Ghent-Bruges School is a distinctive style of manuscript illumination which was prevalent in the Southern Netherlands (mainly present-day Belgium) from about 1475 to about 1550. Though the name highlights the importance of Ghent and Bruges as centres for manuscript production, manuscripts in the style were produced in a wider area.

Background
The term was first used in 1891 by Belgian art historian Joseph Destrée, in his article Recherches sur les elumineurs flamands, and later the same year by French art historian ; later is was used by German art historian Friedrich Winkler in his overview of Flemish illuminated manuscripts from the 15th and 16th centuries. Janet Backhouse has described the Ghent-Bruges school as "one of the last great styles of illumination."

Style
The style developed around the mid-1470s to the 1480s through a break with the earlier, "courtly style" of about 1440 to 1474 which is closely associated with the aristocratic book collection of the Dukes of Burgundy Philip the Good and Charles the Bold. The patronage of Charles continued to play an important role, but the depiction of human figures in the miniatures went from "wooden, clumsily painted stock-figures" to realistic and increasingly large representations of people, eventually developing into half- or full-length portraits. Simultaneously, but probably unrelatedly, the border decoration of the manuscripts developed towards greater realism and came to occupy a larger part of the page. Both in the miniatures and the border decoration, artists displayed a "concern with verisimilitude" and the use of shaded, pastel colors.

Criticism
The term has been criticised for diverting attention too much to the cities of Ghent and Bruges at a time when manuscript production often was an international or regional undertaking with craftsmen operating in many different urban centres and often collaborating on the same projects.

Christopher de Hamel has on the other hand pointed out that while manuscripts produced in both cities during this time were stylistically similar, illuminators rarely moved between them and they served different markets. Book production in Ghent, at the time the administrative capital of the region, was oriented towards a domestic, Flemish market while manuscripts made in Bruges were intended mainly for international export.

Notable artists

 Alexander Bening
 Simon Bening
 Gerard Horenbout
 Lucas Horenbout
 Susanna Hornebolt
 Jan Provoost
 Levina Teerlinc

See also
 Artists of the Tudor court
 Johannes Crabbe
 Raphael de Mercatellis
 The Hours of Joanna I of Castile
 Rothschild Prayerbook

References

Sources cited
 
 
 
 

Illuminated manuscripts
Art movements